SBS Swiss Business School is a private business school located in Zurich, Switzerland with affiliated campuses in Latvia, Kazakhstan, United Arab Emirates, Hong Kong, Argentina, India, Myanmar and Spain.

History 
SBS Swiss Business School was founded in 1998 as a private institution.

Academic programs 
SBS Swiss Business School offers a variety of programs. All academic programs are taught in English. SBS delivers undergraduate, graduate and doctoral programs such as Bachelor, Master and Doctoral degrees.

Undergraduate and graduate programs are proposed in several disciplines, including Business administration, E-Commerce and Science.

An Executive MBA,  an Online MBA and a Doctorate Program in Business Administration are also available.

Accreditation status 

SBS Swiss Business School has received institutional accreditation in accordance with the Swiss Higher Education Act (HEdA).

The Swiss Accreditation Council has accredited SBS as a University of Applied Sciences Institute after a comprehensive quality assessment process conducted by the Agency for Accreditation and Quality Assurance (AAQ).

SBS Swiss Business School is additionally accredited by the British Accreditation Council (BAC), and professionally accredited by Association of Collegiate Business Schools and Programs (ACBSP) as well as the International Assembly for Collegiate Business Education (IACBE). IACBE and ACBSP are U.S. based accreditation bodies that are accredited by the Council for Higher Education Accreditation (CHEA), a recognized accrediting organization that is recognized by the U.S Department of Education.

Furthermore, SBS Swiss Business School holds an EduQua certification, a Swiss Quality Assurance Certificate for providers in the field of Adult Learning and is certified by SWISS LABEL, a protected trademark symbol in Switzerland that is granted to members with genuine Swiss high-quality services and products.

Memberships 

SBS Swiss Business School is a member of the Association to Advance Collegiate Schools of Business (AACSB International), the Swiss Adult Education Association (SVEB), the Swiss Federation of Private Schools (VSP), the Swiss Private School Register and the Central and East European Management Development Association (CEEMAN).

Rankings 

Since 2012, the MBA programs of SBS Swiss Business School have been ranked as tier one MBA academic programs by the CEO Magazine Global MBA Rankings. SBS Swiss Business School has been ranked by CEO magazine for the year 2021 for the following programs: – #3 Global Online MBA, #3 Global Executive MBA, Tier One Global MBA and a Premier DBA Program.

Furthermore, SBS Swiss Business School has been ranked by:
Times Higher Education Impact Rankings 2021 as the only private academic institution out of the five higher education institutions in Switzerland. The Times Higher Education Impact Rankings are the only global performance tables that assess universities against the United Nations’ Sustainable Development Goals (SDGs).

QS Quacquarelli Symonds, which lists the top 57 Online MBA programs across the world for the 2021 edition of the QS Online MBA Rankings. SBS Swiss Business School is the only higher education institution ranked from Switzerland.

Partner institutions 

SBS Swiss Business School has affiliated academic partnerships with the following academic institutions worldwide:
 Al Tareeqah Management Studies in U.A.E, 
 Astana School of Management and Business in Kazakhstan, 
 Hong Kong Management Association in Hong Kong,
 Pacific Prime School in Myanmar,
 BA School of Business and Finance in Riga, Latvia,
 EurAsia Business School in Almaty, Kazakhstan
 IILM Institute of Higher Education in New Delhi, India
 King’s Centre for Professional Development in U.A.E.

References

External links
 Official homepage

Education in Zürich
Business schools in Switzerland
1998 establishments in Switzerland
Educational institutions established in 1998